The Lehavim–Rahat railway station is a station on the Israel Railways lines between Tel Aviv (and points north) and Beersheba, located near Lehavim Junction. The station was opened on June 23, 2007. It serves the suburb of Lehavim and the Bedouin city of Rahat.

The station was briefly renamed to Lehavim Railway Station, or Lehavim Center Railway Station, although Rahat was added back to the name after a campaign led by Rahat's mayor, Talal al-Karnawi.

Station lines

References

External links
Israel Railways official website

Railway stations in Southern District (Israel)
2007 establishments in Israel
Railway stations opened in 2007